Aaron Clausen (born May 30, 1977) is an American politician and a Republican member of the Wyoming House of Representatives representing District 6 since January 10, 2017.

Elections

2016
When incumbent Republican Representative Richard Cannady announced his retirement, Clausen declared his candidacy for the seat.  Clausen defeated businessmen Ed Werner and Chris Sorge in the Republican primary with 50% of the vote. Clausen defeated Democrat Shalyn Anderson in the general election with 88% of the vote.

2018
In the August 18, 2020 Republican Primary, Clausen was unopposed and won with 2,044 votes. Clausen was also unopposed for the November 6, 2018 General Election and won with 2,942 votes.

2020
In the August 18, 2020 Republican Primary, Clausen was challenged by Camilla Hicks but defeated her with 1,542 votes (61.8%). Clausen was unopposed for the November 3, 2020 General Election, winning with 4,296 votes.

References

External links
Official page at the Wyoming Legislature
Profile from Ballotpedia

Living people
Republican Party members of the Wyoming House of Representatives
People from Douglas, Wyoming
1977 births
21st-century American politicians